Saint-Nicolas is a municipality of Wallonia located ine the province of Liège, Belgium. 

It is effectively a part of the greater Liège conurbation stretching west from Liège city centre towards Liège Airport. As of January 1, 2006 Saint-Nicolas had a total population of 22,666. The total area is 6.84 km2 which gives a population density of 3,313 inhabitants per km2. It has the highest population density of any Belgian municipality outside the Brussels-Capital Region.

Since 1977 the municipality consists of the following districts: Montegnée, Saint-Nicolas, and Tilleur.

Notable people
Well known natives include
 Sandra Kim, singer who won the Eurovision Song Contest 1986 held in Bergen, Norway, 1986
 Mario Barravecchia, singer
 Roberto Bisconti, football player
 Georges Theunis, Prime Minister of Belgium, 1921–25, 1934–35.

See also
 List of protected heritage sites in Saint-Nicolas, Belgium

References

External links
 

Municipalities of Liège Province